Brian Murray may refer to:

Brian Murray (actor) (1937–2018), South African actor and director
Brian Murray (governor) (1921–1991), Governor of Victoria, Deputy Chief of the Royal Australian Navy
Brian Murray (Gaelic footballer), Donegal player
Brian Murray (hurler) (born 1984), Limerick player
Brian Murray (judge), Irish judge and former barrister
Brian Murray (politician), American state legislator in the Massachusetts House of Representatives.

See also
Brian Doyle-Murray (born 1945), actor
Bryan Murray (disambiguation)